The Radford Highlanders are composed of 15 teams representing Radford University in intercollegiate athletics, including men and women's basketball, cross country, golf, soccer, and tennis. Men's sports include baseball. Women's sports include volleyball, lacrosse, track and field, and softball. The Highlanders compete in the NCAA Division I and are members of the Big South Conference.

Teams 

Men's Sports
 Baseball
 Basketball
 Cross Country
 Golf
 Soccer
 Tennis

Women's Sports
 Basketball
 Cross Country
 Golf
 Lacrosse
 Soccer
 Softball
 Tennis
 Track and Field
 Volleyball

References

External links